Emerson Obiena is a Filipino pole vaulter and coach. Obiena is silver medalist at the 1993 Southeast Asian Games finishing behind fellow countryman, Edward Lasquete in the pole vault event and at the 1999 Southeast Asian Games. The last medal he won in an international competition was a bronze, which he obtained at the 2007 Southeast Asian Games.

Obiena is a Chinese Filipino, with a Chinese father and a mother with ancestries in Quezon and Samar. He is married to Jeannete Uy, a former hurdler for Centro Escolar University, with whom he had two children: Ernest and Emily, both of whom are pole vaulters.

By 2014, Obiena was serving as the Philippine national coach for pole vaulting. He also serves as his son's coach. In early 2014, for three months, Obiena with his son was given an opportunity to train in Formia, Italy under coach Vitaly Petrov, who also previously coached Sergey Bubka.

References

Filipino male pole vaulters
Southeast Asian Games medalists in athletics
Living people
1964 births
Southeast Asian Games silver medalists for the Philippines
Southeast Asian Games bronze medalists for the Philippines
Competitors at the 1995 Southeast Asian Games
Competitors at the 2005 Southeast Asian Games
People from Tondo, Manila
Filipino sportspeople of Chinese descent